The 24th Army (German: 24. Armee) was a World War II field army of the German Army.

History
The army was formed in October 1944 and was tasked with the defence of southern Germany. The army was commanded by General der Infanterie Hans Schmidt. Formed on the basis of the staff of the V. Armeekorps, between February and April 1945, the army had no units assigned to it. Part of the Alpenfestung, its immediate task was to stop a possible Allied advance through neutral Switzerland. In April 1945, the 405th Division was transferred to it from the 19th Army to serve as the nucleus around which the 24th Army was to be built, but the army never had a paper strength of more than 9,000 men and capitulated to the American VI Corps commander Edward H. Brooks, along with the 19th Army, in May 1945 without having engaged in combat operations.

Commanders

Further reading
 MacDonald, Charles B. The Last Offensive: The United States Army in World War II: The European Theater of Operations, Dover Publications, 2007, .
 Tessin, Georg (1976).  "Verbände und Truppen der deutschen Wehrmacht und Waffen-SS im Zweiten Weltkrieg 1939-1945" (Volume IV), Biblio Verlag, Osnabrück.  .

24
Military units and formations established in 1944
Military units and formations disestablished in 1945